is a city located in Kōchi Prefecture, Japan. , the city had an estimated population of 46‚459 in 22499 households and a population density of 370 persons per km².

Geography
Nankoku is located in the center of Kochi Prefecture on the island of Shikoku. The northern part of the city is in the southern end of the Shikoku Mountains and the southern part has an eight kilometer long coastline on the Pacific Ocean. In between is the Kochi Plain, with the Mononobe River flowing from north to south on the border with Konan. About half of the municipality is forested.

Neighbouring municipalities 
Kōchi Prefecture
 Kōchi
 Kami
 Kōnan
 Motoyama
 Tosa

Climate
Nankoku has a humid subtropical climate (Köppen climate classification Cfa) with hot, humid summers and cool winters. There is significant precipitation throughout the year, especially during June and July.

Demographics
Per Japanese census data, the population of Nankoku in 2020 is 46,664 people. Nankoku has been conducting censuses since 1960.

History 
As with all of Kōchi Prefecture, the area of Nankoku was part of ancient Tosa Province.  The Tosa Kokubun-ji was built during the Nara period, indicating that it was the center of Tosa Province and in proximity to the provincial capital During the Heian period, the nobleman Ki no Tsurayuki wrote the Tosa Diary while staying in what is now Nankoku. During the Sengoku period, Okō Castle was the stronghold of the Chōsokabe clan, who conquered most of Shikoku. During the Edo period, the area was part of the holdings of Tosa Domain ruled by the Yamauchi clan from their seat at Kōchi Castle. Following the Meiji restoration, the town of Goman (後免町) was established within Nagaoka District, Kōchi with the creation of the modern municipalities system on April 1, 1889. On September 30, 1956 the town expanded by annexing 5 neighboring villages. On October 1, 1959 Gomen merged with four neighboring villages to form the city of Nankoku.

Government
Nankoku has a mayor-council form of government with a directly elected mayor and a unicameral city council of 21 members. Nankoku contributes two members to the Kōchi Prefectural Assembly. In terms of national politics, the city is part of Kōchi 1st district of the lower house of the Diet of Japan.

Economy
Nankoku has good road, rail and air connections and has an economy based on light manufacturing, food processing, agriculture and distribution. Strong in the fishing industry and the market industry, Nankoku-shi supplies most of Kochi's agricultural needs, because of the amount of fields and plantations.

Education
Nankoku has 13 public elementary schools and four public middle schools operated by the city government and three public high schools operated by the Kōchi Prefectural Department of Education. There is also one private middle school and one private high school. The prefecture also operates two special education schools for the handicapped.Kochi University's medical school and a branch of the [[National Institute of Technology are located in Nankoku.

Transportation

Airport
Kōchi Ryōma Airport

Railway
 Shikoku Railway Company - Dosan Line
  - 
Tosa Kuroshio Railway - Asa Line
  -  - 
Tosaden Kōtsū - Tosaden Kōtsū Gomen Line (tram line)
  -  -  -  -  -  -  -

Highways 
  Kōchi-Tōbu Expressway

Local attractions
Kōchi Prefectural Museum of History
Okō Castle, National Historic Site
Tosa Kokubun-ji, 29th temple on the Shikoku Pilgrimage
Zenjibu-ji, 32nd temple on the Shikoku Pilgrimage

Notable people from Nankoku
Hiroshi Miyama, enka singer
Yuji Okabayashi, professional wrestler

References

External links

Nankoku City official website 
 Kitaro Shikoku Peace Bell Project
 
 

 
Cities in Kōchi Prefecture
Populated coastal places in Japan